Geoffrey Luc Fabien Malfleury (born 20 January 1988) is a Martiniquais professional footballer who plays for AS Cannes. During his career, he also played in France, Switzerland, Portugal and Cyprus for teams such as Stade Nyonnais, Le Havre, Tours, União da Madeira, Alki Oroklini and FC Voluntari, among others.

Club career
Malfleury was born in Aubervilliers, France.

Wigry Suwałki
Malfleury joined Polish club Wigry Suwałki on 15 April 2019, as a last minute transfer. After passing the medicals and signing the contract, he joined the team that was going to face Podbeskidzie Bielsko-Biała. Efforts were made to authorize him to perform in this match, but it failed and the club could not even be included in the match protocol. A day later, it turned out that he would not be able to appear in any game for the club, because the reason why he terminated his contract with FC Voluntari was not acceptable, according to the Polish Football Association, and they refused to register him. The regulations of Polish Football Association allow only players who have terminated their contracts by mutual consent with their former teams or because the player did not play throughout the year. Eventually, Malfleury's contract with the club was terminated after only a few days.

International career
At international level, Malfleury plays for the Martinique national team.

References

External links
 

1988 births
Living people
French footballers
French people of Martiniquais descent
Martiniquais footballers
Martinique international footballers
Association football forwards
2014 Caribbean Cup players
Championnat National players
Championnat National 2 players
Championnat National 3 players
Liga Portugal 2 players
Cypriot First Division players
Ligue 2 players
Liga I players
Swiss Challenge League players
FC Stade Nyonnais players
Red Star F.C. players
FC Istres players
Le Havre AC players
Tours FC players
C.F. União players
Alki Oroklini players
FC Voluntari players
Wigry Suwałki players
AS Cannes players
French expatriate footballers
Martiniquais expatriate footballers
French expatriate sportspeople in Switzerland
Expatriate footballers in Switzerland
French expatriate sportspeople in Portugal
Expatriate footballers in Portugal
French expatriate sportspeople in Cyprus
Expatriate footballers in Cyprus
French expatriate sportspeople in Romania
Expatriate footballers in Romania
French expatriate sportspeople in Poland
Expatriate footballers in Poland